Mario Pouliot (born September 30, 1963) is a Canadian former ice hockey coach and general manager. He began coaching in the Quebec Major Junior Hockey League (QMJHL) as an assistant coach with the Saint-Hyacinthe Laser. He later coached the Collège Antoine-Girouard Gaulois for eight seasons, and once held the Quebec AAA Midget Hockey League record for the most career wins by a head coach. He also led the Gaulois to the finals of the 2003 Air Canada Cup for the Canadian national Midget AAA championship. He later served two terms as an assistant coach for the Rouyn-Noranda Huskies around a head-coaching stint for the Baie-Comeau Drakkar. During this time, he was chosen as head coach of Team Quebec at the 2011 World U-17 Hockey Challenge. 

Pouliot later coached the Acadie–Bathurst Titan for four seasons, and won the 2018 Memorial Cup championship, then served as the coach and general manager of the Rouyn-Noranda Huskies from 2018 to 2021. He was awarded both the Ron Lapointe Trophy as the QMJHL's coach of the year, and the Maurice Filion Trophy as the QMJHL's general manager of the year in the 2018–19 season. He was also named the Canadian Hockey League Coach of the Year, and led the Rouyn-Noranda Huskies to a 2019 Memorial Cup championship. As of 2019, Pouliot is the only head coach to win consecutive Memorial Cup championships with different teams.

Early life
Mario Pouliot was born September 30, 1963, in Saint-Hyacinthe, Quebec. He played youth ice hockey as a defenceman. At age 17, he was invited to training camp for the Granby Bisons in the Quebec Major Junior Hockey League (QMJHL), but declined the offer to continue playing junior ice hockey in Saint-Hyacinthe. After graduating from junior hockey, he was offered a professional career in Germany, but turned it down also. He later regretted both choices, admitting they were mistakes.

Coaching career

Early QMJHL coaching
Pouliot began coaching at age 20, as an assistant coach at the minor ice hockey level in Saint-Hyacinthe. He credit his friend and mentor Gaétan Pion for getting him started in coaching. Pouliot began his professional hockey career as a scout for the Saint-Hyacinthe Laser during the 1989–90 QMJHL season, and served as the team's assistant coach for the next four seasons until 1994. The team's general manager during this time was his mentor, Gaétan Pion. During his four seasons with the Laser, Saint-Hyacinthe earned a playoff berth in three seasons, but were eliminated in the first round each time. He worked under head coach Norman Flynn in the 1990–91 QMJHL season, head coach Pierre Petroni in the 1991–92 QMJHL season and 1992–93 QMJHL season, and head coach Richard Martel  in the 1993–94 QMJHL season.

Collège Antoine-Girouard

Pouliot served as an assistant coach for the Collège Antoine-Girouard Gaulois in the Quebec AAA Midget Hockey League (LHMAAAQ) from the 1997–98 season to the 2000–01 season, and as the team's head coach from the 2001–02 season to the 2008–09 season. He succeeded Simon Désautels who had been the team's only head coach to date, and was given the additional titles of general manager and team vice-president.

During his eight seasons as head coach of the Gaulois, Pouliot coached 346 games and set a league record of 250 coaching wins, although some sources indicate he achieved 251 victories. Under his guidance, the Gaulois won five regular season division titles, and one league playoffs championship in the 2002–03 season. The Gaulois defeated Collège Charles-Lemoyne in five games for the LHMAAAQ championship. It was the first league title won by the Gaulois in the team's six-season existence. Pouliot stated that his team's strengths were its speed, puck movement, and transition game from offence to defence.

The Gaulois qualified for the 2003 Air Canada Cup, the Canadian national Midget AAA championship. He felt his team could win the national championship if they stayed focused and disciplined, but admitted he knew little about the opposing teams in the tournament. The national event was hosted at the Sault Memorial Gardens in Sault Ste. Marie, Ontario. Collège Antoine-Girouard represented the Quebec Region, and faced opponents from the Pacific, Western, Central, and Atlantic regions of Canada, and the local host team. The Gaulois finished the round-robin portion of the tournament undefeated, and won the semifinal game over the St. John's Maple Leafs midget team by a 3–2 score in overtime. In the gold medal game, Pouliot and the Gaulois lost the final 5–1 to Calgary, earning the silver medal at the Air Canada Cup.

Return to the QMJHL
In 2009, Pouliot quit his job in a laboratory in Saint-Hyacinthe, and accepted an assistant coaching position with the Rouyn-Noranda Huskies. He felt that returning to the QMJHL was an opportunity not to miss. He also looked forward to coaching with André Tourigny who had led both the Canada men's national under-18 ice hockey team and the Canada men's national junior ice hockey team. The Huskies finished the 2009–10 QMJHL season first place in the west division, and reached the second round of the playoffs. Pouliot began the next season with Rouyn-Noranda, but resigned in October when he was offered a head coaching position for another team in the QMJHL.

Pouliot was announced as the new head coach of the Baie-Comeau Drakkar on October 23, 2010. He took over a team in the process of rebuilding, and part-way through a 25-game winless streak which ended in a 4–3 win over Pouliot's former team, on November 26, 2010. His strategy was to implement an offensive style with speed, puck possessions, and better decision making. Despite his efforts, the Drakkar finished the 2010–11 QMJHL season sixth place in the east division, and did not qualify for the playoffs.

Pouliot was chosen to be head coach of Team Quebec at the 2011 World U-17 Hockey Challenge, with Dominique Ducharme as one of the assistant coaches. The event was hosted in Manitoba in December 2010, and January 2011. Pouliot felt that Team Quebec was solid defensively, would be able to play a fast and physical game, and maintain puck possession. The team was anchored on defence by Mike Matheson. Pouliot led Team Quebec to round-robin victories over Team Atlantic Canada, Finland and Germany, but lost to the United States. Quebec finished the preliminary round second place in Group B. Pouliot's squad faced Team Ontario in the semifinal game, but lost 2–1 in overtime to qualify for the bronze medal game. Team Quebec lost 5–4 in overtime to Team Pacific Canada in the bronze medal game, and finished the tournament in fourth place.

Pouliot remained with the Baie-Comeau Drakkar for the 2011–12 QMJHL season. On March 13, 2012, the Drakkar relieved Pouliot of his duties. The team had earned only five points in its last ten games, and dropped from ninth to fourteenth overall. The general manager Steve Ahern took over the team for the remaining three games and the playoffs.

Pouliot was reunited with the Rouyn-Noranda Huskies in the 2012–13 QMJHL season, returning to his role as an assistant coach to Tourigny. The Huskies finished the season second place in the west division, and reached the third round of the playoffs. Gilles Bouchard took over as the team's head coach for the 2013–14 QMJHL season, and Pouliot stayed as an assistant coach. The Huskies finished the season fifth place in the west division, and reached the second round of the playoffs.

Acadie–Bathurst Titan

Pouliot became head coach of the Acadie–Bathurst Titan for the 2014–15 QMJHL season, succeeding Ron Choules. He was excited to return to a head coaching position, despite taking over a team at the bottom of the standings. He stated that "it had been a long time since I had so much fun leading a team", and that the people in Bathurst, New Brunswick were very welcoming. The Titan finished the season last place overall in the league with 42 points, and did not qualify for the playoffs.

In the 2015–16 QMJHL season, Pouliot improved the team record to 60 points and finished fifth in the Maritimes division, and 14th overall in the league. The Titan lost in the first round of the playoffs to the Saint John Sea Dogs in five games.

Pouliot led the Titan to 39 wins, and 84 points in the 2016–17 QMJHL season. Acadie–Bathurst placed third in the Maritimes division, and sixth overall in the QMJHL. In the playoffs, his team defeated the Quebec Remparts in round one, then lost in seven games to the Blainville-Boisbriand Armada in round two. His former colleague André Tourigny who was coaching the Halifax Mooseheads at the time, remarked that the Titan were a difficult team to beat, despite their young age. Pouliot had led the Titan to its first winning season in six years, and in March 2017, Acadie-Bathurst extended Pouliot's contract until the end of the 2018–19 season.

In the 2017–18 QMJHL season, Pouliot coached the Titan to an improved record for the fourth consecutive season. Acadie–Bathurst finished first in the Maritimes division, and second overall in the league with 43 wins and 96 points. In the playoffs, they defeated the Chicoutimi Saguenéens four games to two in round one, then defeated the Sherbrooke Phoenix four games to none in round two, and defeated the Victoriaville Tigres four games to none in the third round to reach the league's finals. Pouliot and the Titan won the President's Cup by defeating the first-overall Blainville-Boisbriand Armada in six games.

The Titan qualified for the 2018 Memorial Cup to determine the Canadian Hockey League (CHL) champion, hosted in Regina, Saskatchewan. The QMJHL champions faced the host Regina Pats, the Swift Current Broncos from the Western Hockey League, and the Hamilton Bulldogs from the Ontario Hockey League. Pouliot coached the Titan to 4–3 overtime victory over Swift Current in game one, then an 8–6 victory over Regina in game two. Prior to the Titan's third game, Pouliot and his general manager Sylvain Couturier planned for the possibility of a three-way tie for first place in the round-robin. They determined that if the situation arose, the team would defend a one-goal deficit to retain a tie-breaking advantage over Hamilton and Regina. In the final two minutes of the third period the Titan were trailing 3–2, but had a power play and a face-off in the attacking zone. Pouliot chose strategically not to pull his goaltender for an extra attacker, to prevent against conceding an empty net goal and losing by two goals. The Titan lost the game by one goal, but advanced directly to the final game based on the tie-breaker. Pouliot hated not going for the win, but called his decision "logical". Pouliot and the Titan went on to defeat the Regina Pats 3–0 in the championship game. After the game, he was quoted as stating "it's special to have won the 100th Memorial Cup, it's forever etched in my memory. No one can ever take that away from me". The victory was the first Memorial Cup for Titan franchise, and the end of the road for Pouliot in Bathurst. He resigned his post in July, when the opportunity arose to coach another contending team in the upcoming season.

Rouyn-Noranda Huskies

On July 5, 2018, Pouliot was announced the new head coach and general manager for the Rouyn-Noranda Huskies, and was signed to a four-year contract. He remarked that, "For me, it's like coming home. I had a special attachment to this team because it was my first stop if you want in the QMJHL and I have always had good relations with people here. It's an opportunity for advancement by occupying both positions, and I want to continue what André Tourigny and Gilles Bouchard have done". The Huskies were given special permission to talk with Pouliot, who was under contract to Acadie–Bathurst during negotiations.

Pouliot and the Huskies went into the 2018–19 QMJHL season with three returning players from the 2016 Memorial Cup team including, the league's top scorer Peter Abbandonato, Jacob Neveu and Samuel Harvey. Pouliot made three trades during the season to bring in NHL prospects Noah Dobson, Joël Teasdale and Louis-Filip Côté. The Huskies won 59 games during the regular season to set a QMJHL record, tied a CHL record with 25 consecutive wins, and were ranked first overall in the CHL. Rouyn-Noranda finished the season with 119 points, to win the west division, the western conference, and were first overall in the QMJHL. In the playoffs, the Huskies defeated the Shawinigan Cataractes four games to two in round one, then defeated the Victoriaville Tigres four games to none in round two, and then the Rimouski Océanic four games to none in round three to reach the finals. Pouliot won his second consecutive President's Cup with a six-game victory over the Halifax Mooseheads.

The Huskies and Pouliot qualified to play at the 2019 Memorial Cup. His team lost its first game to the Guelph Storm by a 5–2 score, then won its next two round-robin games 6–3 over the Prince Albert Raiders, and 4–3 over the Halifax Mooseheads who were hosting the event. Pouliot led his team to a 6–4 victory in the semifinals over the Guelph Storm, and won the championship game by a 4–2 score over Halifax. The victory was the first Memorial Cup title won by the Rouyn-Noranda Huskies, and after the game Pouliot said "all of our players grew up together and for me it's an amazing group. To win the President['s] Cup, to win the Memorial Cup you need a special group and they've done special things". As of 2019, Pouliot became the only head coach to win consecutive Memorial Cup championships with different teams, and joined Don Hay and Bryan Maxwell as the only head coaches to win the Memorial Cup with more than one team.

Pouliot led the Huskies to 29 wins in 63 games during the 2019–20 QMJHL season, and a second-place finish in the west division. The final five games of the regular season and the QMJHL playoffs were cancelled due to the COVID-19 pandemic in Canada.

During the 2020–21 QMJHL season, Pouliot had a heart attack on March 17, 2021. On the next day, he took an indefinite leave of absence from the Huskies. At the time he went on leave, he had led the Huskies to 15 wins and 34 points in the first 34 games of the schedule. In April 2021, Pouliot was the subject of an investigation by the QMJHL for "inappropriate behavior" with colleagues. According to Radio-Canada, he had a history of difficult relationships when his actions were perceived as "intimidation" and "bullying", that resolutions were handled internally by his team. Huskies' team owner Jacques Blais defended Pouliot, whom he described as "a great coach" and "an intense man"; and that "this commitment and attention to detail have enabled him to reach the highest peaks in Canadian junior hockey". Pouliot did not return for the playoffs, and retired his positions due to health reasons on May 25, 2021. In three seasons with the Huskies, he led the team to 113 victories combined in the regular seasons and playoffs.

Coaching philosophy
Pouliot was drawn to hockey due to the speed of the game, which he calls "the fastest sport in the world". He enjoys working on different systems of play, and the strategy of when to deploy different tactics. Pouliot considers it a privilege to be one the sixty head coaches in the CHL, and it is committed to working many hours during the long bus rides for games in the QMJHL. He watches many in-game videos on the busses, and talks at length with players to instill a hard work ethic and not having regrets. He states, "I demand that players have a good work ethic and I seek to develop a mentality of pride. I am a coach who believes in communication and I want to know my players to better help them". He wants his players to assess on-ice situations and react quickly. He also strives for the team's management to treat players as professionals and encourage individual progress. With respect to coaching in smaller market locations, Pouliot said "Even if you're a small market you have to think as a big market. For us it's really important to take care of the people we are drafting, making sure we give them the tools to develop and build a good team".

Pouliot considers Jacques Lemaire to be a role model due to Lemaire's attention to detail and preparedness. Pouliot stated he also learned a lot from both Clément Jodoin, and André Tourigny. Pouliot was praised by Tourigny who stated that "Mario is a hockey genius and a tireless worker. He works extremely hard. He's also a good person, a guy with a big heart".

Coaching record
LHMAAAQ head coaching record.

Note: OTL/SL = Combined total of overtime losses and shootout losses, Win % = Win percentage

QMJHL head coaching record.
 
Note: OTL = Overtime loss, SL = Shootout loss, Win % = Win percentage

Honours and awards

Pouliot was named coach of the year twice during his eight seasons coaching in the LHMAAAQ. He was inducted into the LHMAAAQ Hall of Fame in on May 1, 2011. He was the third coach to receive the honour, and one of the hall of fame's first twenty-nine inductees. In the 2018–19 QMJHL season, Pouliot was awarded the Ron Lapointe Trophy as the league's coach of the year, and the Maurice Filion Trophy as the league's general manager of the year. Pouliot was one of two nominees put forth by Hockey Québec, for the Sport Quebec coach of the year award in the 2018–19 season. He was ultimately named coach of the year for a team sport, by Sport Quebec on May 8, 2019. His daughters accepted the award on his behalf, stating that he was a tireless and passionate worked. On May 25, 2019, he was named the winner of the Brian Kilrea Coach of the Year Award as the CHL's coach of the year, and followed in the footsteps of his mentor Gilles Bouchard who won the award in 2016.

Family
Pouliot has three children. He has two daughters named Laurie and Janika. His son Raphaël (born 1991), played on the Collège Antoine-Girouard Gaulois from 2006 to 2008 while his father coached. Raphaël later played in the QMJHL from 2009 to 2012 with the Shawinigan Cataractes, Montreal Juniors and Blainville-Boisbriand Armada; which coincided with his father's coaching tenures in Rouyn-Noranda and Baie-Comeau. Raphaël later served as the head scout for the Rouyn-Noranda Huskies from 2014 to 2016, and drafted many of the players which his father coached in the 2018–19 season. Prior to the 2019 Memorial Cup, Mario Pouliot said "my son drafted those kids because he believed in them. Having the opportunity to work with them [and] to end up with the President Cup['s], at the Mem[orial] Cup next week, is going to be special for me and my son and all the organization here".

Mario's older brother Robert Pouliot, served as the equipment manager for both the Collège Antoine-Girouard Gaulois and the Acadie–Bathurst Titan while Mario was the head coach.

Notes

References

1963 births
Living people
Acadie–Bathurst Titan coaches
Baie-Comeau Drakkar coaches
Canadian ice hockey coaches
Canadian ice hockey defencemen
Ice hockey people from Quebec
Rouyn-Noranda Huskies coaches
Saint-Hyacinthe Laser coaches
Sportspeople from Saint-Hyacinthe